Richard Grant Mulgan (born 5 March 1940) is a political scientist. He was on the 1985–86 New Zealand Royal Commission that recommended MMP (Mixed Member Proportional) representation for elections to the New Zealand Parliament.

Mulgan was educated at the University of Auckland, and in 1960 matriculated at Merton College, Oxford.

Mulgan is Professor Emeritus at the Crawford School of Economics and Government, Australian National University, Canberra. Prior to his retirement in 2008 he was a professor of Public Policy there.  He was also formerly Professor of Political Studies at Otago and Auckland Universities.

He is the son of John Mulgan, the grandson of Alan Mulgan, and the great-grandson of Edward Ker Mulgan.

Publications
Democracy and Power in New Zealand (1984) 
Maori, Pakeha and Democracy (1989)
Politics in New Zealand (1994, 1997; Auckland University Press)  
Holding Power to Account: Accountability in Modern Democracies (2003) Palgrave MacMillan

References

External links
Personal Page on ANU website

1940 births
Academic staff of the Australian National University
Living people
New Zealand emigrants to Australia
New Zealand scientists
Academic staff of the University of Auckland
Academic staff of the University of Otago
Alumni of Merton College, Oxford